Wari may refer to:

Civilizations
Wariʼ, Amazonian Amerindian nation
Wariʼ language, spoken by the Wariʼ
Wari Empire, political formation that emerged around AD 500 in Peru
Wari culture, Middle Horizon civilization that flourished in Peru
Huari (archaeological site), ruins of the capital city of the Wari Empire, located near Quinua, Peru

Places
Wari, Upper Dir or Union Council, Upper Dir District, Pakistan
Wari Tehsil, an administrative division in Upper Dir District, Pakistan
Wari Thana, an administrative unit in Dhaka District, Bangladesh

Radio stations
WARI (Alabama), a defunct AM radio station, Abbeville, Alabama
WARI-LP, a defunct radio station in New York, United States

Other uses
Wari (dance), a typical dance of the Ancash Region in Peru
Wari (game), or Oware, a board game
Wari River, or Weri'i, a river in Ethiopia

See also 
Waris (disambiguation)
Warri, a city in Nigeria
Warir, an island in Indonesia

Language and nationality disambiguation pages